Janarius Robinson (born May 4, 1998) is an American football defensive end for the Philadelphia Eagles of the National Football League (NFL). He played college football at Florida State.

Professional career

Minnesota Vikings
Robinson was drafted by the Minnesota Vikings in the fourth round, 134th overall, of the 2021 NFL Draft. He signed his four-year rookie contract with Minnesota on May 19, 2021. He was placed on injured reserve on August 23, 2021, prematurely ending his rookie season.

Robinson was waived on August 30, 2022. He was signed to the practice squad one day later.

Philadelphia Eagles
On September 13, 2022, Robinson was signed by the Philadelphia Eagles off the Vikings practice squad. He was placed on injured reserve on October 15. He was activated on December 6. Without Robinson, the Eagles made Super Bowl LVII and lost 38-35 to the Kansas City Chiefs.

References

External links
Minnesota Vikings bio
 Florida State Seminoles bio

1998 births
Living people
People from Panama City, Florida
Players of American football from Florida
American football defensive ends
American football outside linebackers
Florida State Seminoles football players
Minnesota Vikings players
Philadelphia Eagles players